is a voice acting simulation game designed by Spümcø, a cartoon animation studio founded by The Ren & Stimpy Show creator and animator John Kricfalusi. Artwork and character design were undertaken by Spümcø for both games and music was performed by such notable musicians as Eric Gorfain.

Versions and sequels
The game was released in December 2001 exclusively to Japan and a Performance Pack was released shortly afterward. Following this, a sequel entitled Yoake no Mariko 2nd Act was released on 24 January 2002.

Gameplay
To play Yoake no Mariko, players must provide voice acting to correspond with a movie scene that unfolds before them. There are six levels (or scenes) in the game which include such genres as the western drama, the horror flick, and the Kung Fu action flick. As the background film clip plays, on-screen cues inform players when to deliver their lines and how to modulate their vocal intonations in a manner similar to karaoke games. The spoken lines are then graded by an in-game algorithm and the players are scored on their performance. Specifically considered are the players' timings, volumes, and tones.

References

2001 video games
Japan-exclusive video games
PlayStation 2 games
PlayStation 2-only games
Simulation video games
Spümcø
Video games developed in Japan